Roslyn Walker (b. Russel Erwood on 19 March 1981 Brislington, Bristol, England) is an entertainer. He currently resides in Conwy with his partner, dancer Foxee Stole.

Walker made his name as an escape artist and stuntman but his work also includes being the official jester of Conwy and under his real name he worked as TV magic consultant for Breaking Magic on Discovery Channel and Tricked! on British TV channel ITV2. Over the years Walker has recreated Harry Houdini's most technically challenging escape stunts including the suspended straitjacket escape and the world famous Mirror Handcuff Challenge.

Walker broke two world records within the field of escapology and has been voted 6th in the Ten Greatest Escape Artists in History.

World records

On 29 April 2011 in The Albert Pub, Llandudno, Walker set two new world records for escaping from regulation police handcuffs:

 The Most Handcuff Escapes in One Minute: The previous record of six was beaten by Walker setting a new world record of nine handcuff escapes in a single minute.
 The Most Handcuff Escapes in One Hour: Walker ~ the Gentleman Escape Artist escaped from 677 pairs of handcuffs in full view without the use of keys within one hour beating the record set by Zdenek Bradac in the Czech Republic in 2010 by 50.

Modern mirror handcuff challenge

The original Mirror Handcuff Challenge was issued to Harry Houdini in 1904 by the newspaper The London Daily Mirror.

In 2008 Walker appeared at the Llandudno Victorian Extravaganza and at the end of the event was challenged by the committee to recreate the feat under the same conditions Houdini faced over 100 years previous.

Just as when Houdini performed the original Mirror Cuff Challenge, Walker did not see how the cuffs locked or unlocked, he did not see or handle the key used to secure the restraints, nor were the cuffs removed once they had been locked in place. To do so would have been to accept defeat.

Houdini had two advantages over Walker's attempt. The first was that Houdini was able to hide inside a cabinet away from the eyes of the public, Walker had to perform his attempt before an audience of 10000 people. The second advantage is that Houdini had as much time as he wanted. Walker had a strict time limit.

Walker was successful and the Extravaganza Challenge Cuffs now form part of his collection of defeated handcuffs and can be seen in all venues he performs in.

Suspended straitjacket escape
Walker recreated this stunt in the same way that Houdini did it for Fanfarlo's music video The Walls are Coming Down.

Suspended by his feet Walker dangled above the band and managed to free himself a total of seven times during just three hours of filming. This stunt was so extreme that Walker left the shoot bleeding from the armpits.

References

External links
 

Escapologists
British stunt performers
English magicians
British circus performers
English entertainers
Sideshow performers
Jugglers
People from Bristol
1981 births
Living people